Although there are no active volcanoes in the continental territory of Portugal, apart from geological remnants of ancient volcanism, the Portuguese Atlantic island possessions have a long history of active volcanism. The following is a list of active and extinct volcanoes in the Portuguese territories of the Azores and Madeira.

Azores

Madeira

See also 
Geology of Madeira

References 
Sources
 
 
 

Portugal
Volcanoes